Jai Uttal (born June 12, 1951) is an American musician. He is a Grammy-nominated singer and “a pioneer in the world music community with his eclectic East-meets-West sound.”

Biography
Uttal grew up in New York City and lived in a home filled with music where he  studied classical piano from the age of seven, and later learned to play banjo, harmonica, and guitar. His father was record label executive Larry Uttal.  At the age of 17, Uttal heard Indian music for the first time, which he said, “touched his heart like sounds of home.” At 19, Uttal moved to California and studied under Sarod player, Ali Akbar Khan. He later began making regular trips to India where he spent time with practitioners from both Buddhist and Hindu traditions, lived among the Bauls, wandering Bengali street musicians, and singing with the kirtan wallahs in the temple of his Hindu guru Neem Karoli Baba. Uttal adopted the spiritual practice of kirtan, the ancient bhakti yoga of chanting the names of God.

Artist statement and reception
Uttal's music is very popular in the yoga community, being described as “very hypnotic.” One reviewer stated, “He does a great job of explaining the purpose of chanting and kirtan.” “The practice of calling to the divine creates a bridge between the individual and the eternal, opening the heart and welcoming the spirit.” Uttal says, “These ancient chants contain a transformative power and healing energy. By singing these prayers we join a stream of consciousness and devotion that has been flowing for centuries.” Uttal says, “Music that creates bridges. Music that unites hearts and cultures. Music that brings peace.”

In one biography it is said, “Jai Uttal has cultivated a voice and musical styles that carries the listener into the heart of devotion, prayer, and healing, and to an ecstatic remembrance of the divine.”

Albums
In 1990 Uttal released his debut album, Footprints, on Triloka Records, which featured “world music innovator Don Cherry and Indian vocalist Lakshmi Shankar.” The album was in the top ten on the world music charts. In 1992, Uttal released Monkey. The next year, in 1994, Beggars and Saints was released, which was a “tribute to the Bauls of Bangal.” In addition to the new album, Uttal produced two CD's for his teacher, Ustad Ali Akbar. Journey and Garden of Dreams became extremely popular in the Indian community.

Three years later, Shiva Station was released, which was mixed by the innovative and ubiquitous producer Bill Laswell. Shiva Station presented traditional chants in a totally new way. The concerts united the temple and the nightclub, the sacred and the worldly; emphasizing the underlying theme that spirituality and devotion can pervade all aspects of life. Around this time the popularity of yoga was on the rise. Uttal began to receive more requests to lead kirtan workshops and concerts all over the world. Uttal released a live kirtan CD entitled Nectar to begin to chronicle these kirtan events.

In 2000, a compilation of his four Triloka albums appeared as Spirit Room. In February 2002, Jai Uttal and the Pagan Love Orchestra released, on Narada Records, Mondo Rama, which means World is Rama or Everything is God. The album has been called Uttal's most personal expression to date. “Combining Brazilian influences, Hebrew prayers, Appalachian Blues, Beatles psychedelia, and, of course, Indian music and chants, Mondo Rama explodes from the speakers in celebration and rebirth.”

In 2009, Uttal released Thunder Love. One reviewer said the following about the album, “[It’s] a true example of ‘world music,’ it's a pan-cultural potpourri of sounds and styles from around the globe, seamlessly sewn into a contemporary pop/rock format. Uttal's soulful singing and spiritual themes provide the crucial connective thread throughout the album."

2011 saw the release of  Queen of Hearts, a “unique mixture of reggae, ska, and samba rhythms, used as a backdrop for call and response, dance oriented kirtan, and invoking Queen Radha (Radharani), the bestower of devotion.”

In 2003, Uttal began the first of several recordings focused on the practice of bhakti yoga (kirtan) for the Sounds True label. These have included: Kirtan! The Art and Practice of Ecstatic Chant, Music for Yoga and Other Joys, Loveland, Dial M for Mantra, and Pranayama, a collaboration with his wife, yoga teacher and bhakti dancer, Nubia Teixeira. The two had a son, Ezra, which led to Uttal's inspiration to focus his work towards kids. Uttal began to lead children's kirtan events near his home in Northern California and he created an album especially for children entitled Kirtan Kids: The Elephant, the Monkey, and the Little Butter Thief. In addition to those, Uttal also hosted donation-based events at several yoga studios. At these particular events, children would sit around in a circle and listen as Uttal told “colorful stories drawn from Ramayana and other Indian myths.” The chants during these events were kid-friendly versions.

“Kirtan Kids recreates the feeling of these events and gives parents a new way to introduce children to kirtan.” The album features “an elephant solo, the sounds of banging pots and pans, and music from about a dozen instruments, including the glockenspiel and a toy piano.” The album also includes “narrated tales of Gopala, the child form of Krishna; the elephant-headed god Ganesha; and the monkey god Hanuman.”

In 2014 Jai Uttal with Ben Leinbach released Lifeline which explores a decade of their collaborations sequenced as an unfolding musical celebration of their favorite tracks ranging from the unadorned primordial chant to layered sacred sound immersions.”
  
In 2014 Uttal revisited Shiva Station also with Ben Leinbach and re-created his 1997 work to "bring us closer to the music itself with unadorned, intimate arrangements that illuminate directly the spiritual heart of each composition."”

In addition to his own works, Uttal also owns the back catalogue of Private Stock Records, which was his father's record label in the 1970s.

Discography
 Footprints (1990) - with Don Cherry and Lakshmi Shankar
 Monkey (1992)
 Yoga Chant
 Beggars and Saints (1994)
 Shiva Station (1997)
 Spirit Room (2000)
 Nectar (2001)
 Mondo Rama (2002)
 Kirtan! (2004)
 Music for Yoga and Other Joys (2004)
 Pranayama (2005)
 Loveland: Music for Dreaming and Awakening, with Ben Leinbach (Sounds True, 2006)
 Dial M for Mantra (2007)
 Thunder Love (2009)
 Bhakti Bazaar (2010)
 Queen of Hearts (2011)
 Kirtan Kids (2011)
 Lifeline (2014) - with Ben Leinbach
 Return to Shiva Station (2014)
 Roots, Rock, Rama! (2017)

References

External links
 
 Music Review by The Yoga Journal
 Chris Grosso Interview of Jai Uttal

1951 births
Living people
20th-century American guitarists
20th-century American male musicians
21st-century American guitarists
21st-century American male musicians
American male guitarists
American male singer-songwriters
American world music musicians
Guitarists from California
Harmonium players
Hindi-language singers
Kirtan performers
Sarod players
Singers from New York City
Singer-songwriters from California
Singer-songwriters from New York (state)
World music singers